This is a list of amphibians of Hungary.

Frogs and toads (Anura) 

 Bombina bombina – European fire-bellied toad 
 Bombina variegata – yellow-bellied toad 
 Bufo bufo – European toad 
 Bufotes viridis – European green toad 
 Hyla arborea – European tree frog 
 Pelobates fuscus – common spadefoot toad 
 Pelophylax ribidundus – marsh frog 
 Pelophylax lessonae – pool frog 
 Rana arvalis – moor frog 
 Rana dalmatina – agile frog 
 Rana temporaria – European common frog

Newts and salamanders (Urodela) 

 Icthyosaura alpestris – alpine newt 
 Lissotriton vulgaris – smooth newt 
 Salamandra salamandra – fire salamander 
 Triturus carnifex – Italian crested newt 
 Triturus cristatus – great crested newt 
 Triturus dobrogicus – Danube crested newt

References 

 https://www.inaturalist.org/check_lists/7750-Hungary-Check-List

Hungary